The Hockey Club SKA-1946 Saint Petersburg, is a Russian junior ice hockey club based in Saint Petersburg, Russia. They are members of the Western Conference in the Junior Hockey League (MHL), the junior league of the KHL.

History
The club was established in 2009 to participate in the MHL. The club was named SKA-1946 after the establishment year of SKA Saint Petersburg, which the club has considered as one of their affiliates.

In April 2015, the team reached the Kharlamov Cup finals and become the vice-champion for the first time in their history.

Season-by-season record

Playoffs
 2009–10 — Lost in 1/8 Finals, 2–3 (Omsk Hawks)
 2010–11 — Did not qualify
 2011–12 — Lost in Conference quarterfinals, 2–3 (Krasnaya Armiya)
 2012–13 — Lost in Conference quarterfinals, 0–3 (MHC Spartak Moscow)
 2013–14 — Lost in Conference quarterfinals, 0–3 (Krasnaya Armiya)
 2014–15 — Lost in Kharlamov Cup Finals, 1-4 (Chaika)
 2015–16 — Lost in 1/8 Finals, 0–3 (Almaz)
 2016–17 — Lost in Conference quarterfinals, 1-3 (Almaz)
 2017–18 — TBD

Head coaches
Ivano Zanatta
Sergei Pushkov
Andrei Andreev
Mikhail Kravetz

See also
SKA Saint Petersburg

External links
Official Website

Ice hockey teams in Russia
SKA Saint Petersburg
Sports clubs in Saint Petersburg
Junior Hockey League (Russia) teams
Armed Forces sports society
Military ice hockey teams